Living in the Moment is the first and only EP by post-hardcore band Across Five Aprils, released on September 14, 2004, through Indianola Records.

The EP is the band's last release with founding members Steve Taylor (vocals) and Jason Barry (bass), and is the first release with guitarist Jarrod Smith who replaced Jason Fields, who departed the band in 2003 after the release of their debut album A Tragedy in Progress. Like their first album, the EP was also recorded at XadeX Studios with producer John Taylor.

In reviews of the EP, the band has been compared to many diverse bands, such as Atreyu, Thrice, Scatter the Ashes, Coalesce and Converge.

Track listing

Personnel
 Steve Taylor – lead vocals
 Drew Miller – drums, percussion
 Zak Towe – guitar
 Jarrod Smith – guitar
 Jason Barry – bass
 Corey Crowder - guest vocals on "Through the Pane"
 Produced by John Taylor and Across Five Aprils
 Recorded, engineered, mixed, mastered by John Taylor at XadeX Studios (May 2004)

References

2004 EPs
Across Five Aprils (band) albums
Indianola Records EPs